Complexity theory and organizations, also called complexity strategy or complex adaptive organizations, is the use of the study of complexity systems in the field of strategic management and organizational studies. It draws from research in the natural sciences that examines uncertainty and non-linearity. Complexity theory emphasizes interactions and the accompanying feedback loops that constantly change systems. While it proposes that systems are unpredictable, they are also constrained by order-generating rules.

Complexity theory has been used in the fields of strategic management and organizational studies. Application areas include understanding how organizations or firms adapt to their environments and how they cope with conditions of uncertainty. Organizations have complex structures in that they are dynamic networks of interactions, and their relationships are not aggregations of the individual static entities. They are adaptive; in that, the individual and collective behavior mutate and self-organize corresponding to a change-initiating micro-event or collection of events.

Key concepts

Complex adaptive systems 
Organizations can be treated as complex adaptive systems (CAS) as they exhibit fundamental CAS principles like self-organization, complexity, emergence, interdependence, space of possibilities, co-evolution, chaos, and self-similarity.

CAS are contrasted with ordered and chaotic systems by the relationship that exists between the system and the agents which act within it. In an ordered system the level of constraint means that all agent behavior is limited to the rules of the system. In a chaotic system, the agents are unconstrained and susceptible to statistical and other analyses. In a CAS, the system and the agents co-evolve; the system lightly constrains agent behavior, but the agents modify the system by their interaction with it. This self-organizing nature is an important characteristic of CAS; and its ability to learn to adapt, differentiate it from other self-organizing systems.

Organizational environments can be viewed as complex adaptive systems where coevolution generally occurs near the edge of chaos, and it should maintain a balance between flexibility and stability to avoid organizational failure. As a response to coping with turbulent environments; businesses bring out flexibility, creativity, agility, and innovation near the edge of chaos; provided the organizational structure has sufficient decentralized, non-hierarchical network structures.

Implications for organizational management 
CAS approaches to strategy seek to understand the nature of system constraints and agent interaction and generally takes an evolutionary or naturalistic approach to strategy.  Some research integrates computer simulation and organizational studies.

Complexity theory and knowledge management
Complexity theory also relates to knowledge management (KM) and organizational learning (OL). "Complex systems are, by any other definition, learning organizations." Complexity Theory, KM, and OL are all complementary and co-dependent. “KM and OL each lack a theory of how cognition happens in human social systems – complexity theory offers this missing piece”.

Complexity theory and project management 
Complexity theory is also being used to better understand new ways of doing project management, as traditional models have been found lacking to current challenges. This approaches advocates forming a "culture of trust" that "welcomes outsiders, embraces new ideas, and promotes cooperation."

Recommendations for managers 
Complexity Theory implies approaches that focus on flatter, more flexible organizations, rather than top-down, command-and-control styles of management.

Additional examples 
A typical example for an organization behaving as CAS is Wikipedia – collaborated and managed by a loosely organized management structure, composed of a complex mix of human–computer interactions. By managing behavior, and not only mere content, Wikipedia uses simple rules to produce a complex, evolving knowledge base which has largely replaced older sources in popular use.

Other examples include the complex global macroeconomic network within a country or group of countries; stock market and complex web of cross-border holding companies; manufacturing businesses; and any human social group-based endeavor in a particular ideology and social system such as political parties, communities, geopolitical organizations, and terrorist networks of both hierarchical and leaderless nature.  This new macro level state may create difficulty for an observer in explaining and describing the collective behavior in terms of its constituent parts, as a result of the complex dynamic networks of interactions, outlined earlier.

See also 
 Complexity theory (disambiguation)
 Cynefin Centre for Organisational Complexity
 The Santa Fe Institute
 Global brain
 Self-organization
 The New England Complex Systems Institute
 Ralph Douglas Stacey
 Complex Adaptive Leadership

References

Further reading 
 Axelrod, R. A., & Cohen, M. D., 2000. Harnessing Complexity: Organizational Implications of a Scientific Frontier. New York: The Free Press
 Yaneer Bar-Yam (2005). Making Things Work: Solving Complex Problems in a Complex World. Cambridge, MA: Knowledge Press
 Beautement, P. & Broenner, C. 2010. Complexity Demystified: A Guide for Practitioners. Originally published in Axminster: Triarchy Press
Biermann, F. & Kim, R.E. (Eds). 2020. Architectures of Earth System Governance: Institutional Complexity and Structural Transformation. Cambridge University Press.
 Brown, S. L., & Eisenhardt, K. M. 1997. The Art of Continuous Change: Linking Complexity Theory and Time-paced Evolution in Relentlessly Shifting Organizations. Administrative Science Quarterly, 42: 1–34
 Burns, S., & Stalker, G. M. 1961. The Management of Innovation. London: Tavistock Publications
 Davis, J. P., Eisenhardt, K. M., & Bingham, C. B. 2009. Optimal Structure, Market Dynamism, and the Strategy of Simple Rules. Administrative Science Quarterly, 54: 413–452
 De Toni, A.F., Comello, L., 2010. Journey into Complexity. Udine: Lulu Publisher
 Fonseca, J. (2001). Complexity and Innovation in Organizations. London: Routledge
 Douma, S. & H. Schreuder, Economic Approaches to Organizations, 6th edition, Harlow: Pearson.
 Gell-Mann, M. 1994. The Quark and the Jaguar: Adventures in the Simple and the Complex. New York: WH Freeman
 Kauffman, S. 1993. The Origins of Order. New York, NY: Oxford University Press.
 Levinthal, D. 1997. Adaptation on Rugged Landscapes. Management Science, 43: 934–950
 Liang, T.Y. 2016. Complexity-Intelligence Strategy: A New Paradigmatic Shift. Singapore: World Scientific Publishing.
 March, J. G. 1991. Exploration and Exploitation in Organizational Learning. Organization Science, 2(1): 71–87
 McKelvey, B. 1999. Avoiding Complexity Catastrophe in Coevolutionary Pockets: Strategies for Rugged Landscapes. Organization Science, 10(3): 249–321
 McMillan, E. 2004 Complexity, Organizations and Change. Routledge. Hardback.  Paperback
 Moffat, James. 2003. Complexity Theory and Network Centric Warfare.
 Obolensky N. 2010 Complex Adaptive Leadership - Embracing Paradox and Uncertainty
 Perrow, C. Complex Organizations: A Critical Essay Scott, Forseman & Co., Glenville, Illinois
 Rivkin, J., W. 2000. Imitation of Complex Strategies. Management Science, 46(6): 824–844
 Rivkin, J. and Siggelkow, N. 2003. Balancing Search and Stability: Interdependencies Among Elements of Organizational Design. Management Science, 49, pp. 290–311
 Rudolph, J., & Repenning, N. 2002. Disaster Dynamics: Understanding the Role of Quantity in Organizational Collapse. Administrative Science Quarterly, 47: 1–30
 Schilling, M. A. 2000. Toward a General Modular Systems Theory and its Applicability to Interfirm Product Modularity. Academy of Management Review, 25(2): 312–334
 Siggelkow, S. 2002. Evolution toward Fit. Administrative Science Quarterly, 47, pp. 125–159
 Simon, H. 1996 (1969; 1981) The Sciences of the Artificial (3rd Edition) MIT Press
 Smith, Edward. 2006. Complexity, Networking, and Effects Based Approaches to Operations] by Edward
 Snowden, D.J. Boone, M. 2007. "A Leader's Framework for Decision Making". Harvard Business Review, November 2007, pp. 69–76.
 Weick, K. E. 1976. Educational Organizations as loosely coupled systems. Administrative Science Quarterly, 21(1): 1–19

Systems science
Business economics

Technology strategy
Complex systems theory
Cybernetics